Nesospiza is a genus of seed-eating birds in the tanager family Thraupidae found on the Tristan da Cunha archipelago in the South Atlantic Ocean.

Taxonomy and species list
The genus Nesospiza was introduced in 1873 by the German ornithologist Jean Cabanis with the Inaccessible Island finch as the type species. The genus name combines the Ancient Greek nēsos meaning "island" (i.e. Tristan da Cunha) with spiza meaning "finch". The genus now contains three species.

References

 
Bird genera